Shipton railway station serves the villages of Shipton-under-Wychwood and Milton-under-Wychwood in Oxfordshire, England. The station and all trains serving it are operated by Great Western Railway.

Services
Shipton is served by 2-3 trains in each direction each weekday.

Up Saturday services are enhanced, with four services running through to London Paddington.

There is no Sunday service from Shipton in either direction. A normal service weekday service operates on most bank holidays.

References

Railway stations in Oxfordshire
DfT Category F2 stations
Former Great Western Railway stations
Railway stations in Great Britain opened in 1853
Railway stations served by Great Western Railway
1853 establishments in England